The Last Express is a 1938 American mystery film directed by Otis Garrett and written by Edmund Hartmann. It is based on the 1937 novel The Last Express by Baynard Kendrick. The film stars Kent Taylor, Dorothea Kent, Don Brodie, Paul Hurst, Addison Richards, Greta Granstedt, Robert Emmett Keane and J. Farrell MacDonald. The film was released on October 28, 1938, by Universal Pictures.

Plot

Cast

Production
In 1937, Universal Pictures made a deal with the Crime Club, who were publishers of whodunnits. Over the next few years Universal released several mystery films in the series. The Last Express was one of the entries in the series.

Release
The Last Express opened in New York in the week of October 12, 1938. It was released further on October 28, 1938.

Reception
Archer Winsten of the New York Post found the film to be "unusually baffling".

References

Footnotes

Sources

External links
 

1938 films
1938 mystery films
American black-and-white films
American mystery films
Universal Pictures films
Films directed by Otis Garrett
1930s English-language films
1930s American films